Boo Cook (born 1972) is a British comic artist, whose work mainly features in the comic 2000 AD.

Career
Cook's art has appeared in the ABC Warriors and Judge Dredd, as Asylum (written by Rob Williams) and Dead Men Walking (written by David Bishop).

In 2005, Cook graduated to regular work on the flagship story on 2000 AD, Judge Dredd, mostly to scripts by Gordon Rennie and Simon Spurrier.  With Spurrier he developed new comedy character Harry Kipling.

Boo Cook started and contributed to the 2000AD Online Charity Auction. Cook has also been providing the art for the latest Judge Anderson stories by Alan Grant, and providing cover artwork on titles such as Marvel's X-Factor, the Elephantmen: War Toys prequel mini-series, and subsequently, the interior art for Elephantmen #21. In 2014, he began working on Doctor Who titles for Titan Magazines.

Bibliography

Comics
Tharg's Future Shocks:
 "Home from the War" (with Steve Moore, in 2000 AD #1208, 2000)
 "Earth Works" (with Dan Abnett, in 2000 AD #1233, 2001) 
 "Sex Machine" (with Simon Spurrier, in 2000 AD #1264, 2001)
 "Skin Game" (with Steve Moore, in 2000 AD #1268, 2001)
 "Goldie Locke & the Three B.E.A.R.s" (with Andrew Lewis, in 2000 AD #1288, 2002)
 ABC Warriors: "The Zero Option" (with Pat Mills, in 2000 AD #1243-1245, 2001)
 Asylum (with Rob Williams, tpb, April 2007):
 "Asylum" (in 2000 AD #1313-1321, 2002)
 "Asylum 2" (in 2000 AD #1406-1414, 2004)
 Dead Men Walking (with David Bishop as "James Stevens", in 2000 AD #1362-1370, 2003) 
 Judge Dredd:
 "Doppelganger" (with Ben Dickson, in Zarjaz (vol. 2) #1, 2005)
 "Descent" (with Gordon Rennie, in 2000 AD #1432-1436, 2005)
 "In the Stomm" (with Simon Spurrier, in Judge Dredd Megazine #236, 2005)
 "The Listener" (with Gordon Rennie, in Judge Dredd Megazine #265, 2007)
 "The Biographer" (with Rob Williams, in 2000 AD #1537, 2007)
 "The Slow Walk" (with Rob Williams, in 2000 AD #1698, 2010)
Harry Kipling (with Simon Spurrier):
 "Prologue" (in 2000 AD #1476, 2006)
 "Mad Gods & Englishmen" (in 2000 AD #1481-1483, 2006)
 "Whetting the Whistle" (in 2000AD #1492-1493, 2006)
 "Something for Nothing" (in 2000AD #1497-1499, 2006)
 "The Hitman and Hermoth" (in 2000AD #1509-ongoing, 2006)
 "Team Titanic!" (with Al Ewing, in The End Is Nigh #3, 2006)
 Anderson: Psi Division (with Alan Grant):
 "Wiierd" (in Judge Dredd Megazine #272-276, 2008)
 "Biophyle" (in Judge Dredd Megazine #277-278, 2008)
 "The House of Vyle" (in Judge Dredd Megazine #300-304, 2010)
Damnation Station (with Al Ewing):
 "The Feelings That You Lack" (in 2000 AD #1681, 2010)
 "The Sun Always Shines" (in 2000 AD #1682-1684, 2010)
Doctor Who (with Al Ewing)
 Whodunnit (in Doctor Who: The Eleventh Doctor #4, 2014)
 The Sound of Our Voices (in Doctor Who: The Eleventh Doctor #5, 2014)

Covers
Cover work includes:

2000 AD #1342, 1365, 1368, 1411, 1413, 1422, 1436, 1454, 1471, 1492, 1500, 1509, 1532 and 1561 (2003-)
The End Is Nigh #2 
2000 AD Winter Special (2005)
Judge Dredd Megazine #254 and 274 (2007)
Elephantmen: War Toys #1-3 (2007–2008)
X-Factor:  The Quick and the Dead (July 2008)
 Wolverine: Dangerous Games (August 2008)
X-Factor #33-37 (September 2008)
 X-Factor Special: Layla Miller (October 2008)

Other work
In 2010 Boo Cook provided the artwork for the debut album of British Alt Rock band The Longest Day

References

External links

Boo Cook's blog

Interviews

British comics artists
1972 births
Living people
Date of birth missing (living people)
Place of birth missing (living people)